Andrianantoandro Raharinaivo is a Malagasy politician.  A member of the National Assembly of Madagascar, he was elected as a member of the Tiako I Madagasikara party; he represents the constituency of Ambohidratrimo.

He was the president of the transitional lower house of Madagascar parliament from October 2010 to February 2014.

References

Year of birth missing (living people)
Living people
Members of the National Assembly (Madagascar)
Tiako I Madagasikara politicians
Presidents of the National Assembly (Madagascar)